The Gerber Life Insurance Company was formed in 1967 in Fremont, Michigan. Gerber Life provides juvenile and family life insurance products to middle-income families along with medical insurance to small- and medium-sized businesses. It is currently owned by Western & Southern Financial Group, who licenses the Gerber trademark from the Gerber Products Company unit of Nestlé.

History
Gerber Life is headquartered in White Plains, New York, and has an operation center in Fremont, Michigan. The company has $52 billion of life insurance in force with 3.6 million policies for individuals throughout the United States, Puerto Rico, and Canada.

In 2007, Nestlé acquired the company with Gerber Products. Nestlé announced on September 17, 2018, that it would be selling the Gerber Life Insurance Company to Western & Southern Financial Group for $1.55 billion.

Products 

 Whole Life Plan 
 Family Life Insurance Plan
 Accident Protection Insurance
 Gerber Life College Plan

References

External links
Gerber life insurance Grow up plans
Gerber Life Insurance corporate Web site

Financial services companies established in 1967
Companies based in Michigan
American companies established in 1967
Newaygo County, Michigan
1967 establishments in Michigan
Companies based in White Plains, New York
Life insurance companies of the United States
2018 mergers and acquisitions